Eric Allan Uptagrafft (born February 16, 1966) is an American sport shooter.

He was born in Spokane, Washington, and lives in Firestone, Colorado.  He competed for the United States in the 1996 Summer Olympics, in the Men's Small-Bore Rifle, Prone, 50, coming in tied for 30th.  At the 2012 Summer Olympics, he finished in 16th in the same event.  He shares the world record in the 50 meter rifle prone competition.

Current world record in 50 m rifle prone

References

1966 births
Living people
American male sport shooters
United States Distinguished Marksman
Olympic shooters of the United States
Shooters at the 1996 Summer Olympics
Sportspeople from Spokane, Washington
People from Weld County, Colorado
Sportspeople from Colorado
Shooters at the 2012 Summer Olympics
Pan American Games medalists in shooting
West Virginia Mountaineers rifle shooters
Pan American Games silver medalists for the United States
Shooters at the 2003 Pan American Games